Solanum asteropilodes is a species of plant in the family Solanaceae. It is endemic to Ecuador.

References

Flora of Ecuador
asteropilodes
Vulnerable plants
Taxonomy articles created by Polbot
Taxa named by Friedrich August Georg Bitter